Dave Rogers (born 25 August 1975) is an English football coach and former player who is the manager of League of Ireland First Division club Finn Harps.

Playing career

Rogers was born in Liverpool, England. With his previous club, Shelbourne, he had quite a successful spell. He joined them from Dutch club Cambuur Leeuwarden in June 2003. Rogers made his debut that same month against Derry City, the club he would later join in the future, and quickly established himself as a key player in the side of Pat Fenlon, who was the Shelbourne manager at the time. He won the League of Ireland championship with Shelbourne in 2003, 2004, and 2006.

"Scouser", as he is known by most was one of the favourite players of the club's fans, especially after his volley in the UEFA Champions League second qualifying round against the Croatian champions Hajduk Split.

His goal spurred Shels on to a famous victory and made the Reds the first Irish team to make it to the Champions League third qualifying round. However, the club was downtrodden with financial difficulties and unable to sustain its first-team squad by early 2007,

His former manager, Fenlon, who had taken the managerial position at Derry City in December 2006, convinced him that the Brandywell was the new place for him, and his signing of a two-year contract was announced by Derry City on 28 January 2007.

He made his debut for his new club during a pre-season friendly game against Newry City prior to the beginning of the League of Ireland 2007 season.

He then signed for St Patrick's Athletic during the June transfer market and played in their UEFA Cup 1st Qualifying Round against OB Odense of Denmark.

Rogers had earlier played in the Football League for Chester City, Peterborough United, Scunthorpe United and Carlisle United, and was at Tranmere Rovers. He also played in Scotland for Ayr United and Dundee in the Scottish Premier league and also won the Scottish First Division title with Dundee in the 1997–98 season.

Rogers joined Sporting Fingal on loan from St Patrick's Athletic on 27 February 2008. He returned to the Saints on 1 July. On 22 November he along with 8 other St. Patrick's Athletic players left on a free transfer.

In August 2009 Rogers signed for Lisburn Distillery but after four months both parties agreed to part by mutual consent and on good terms.

In March 2010 Rogers signed for newly formed Cork City FORAS Co-op. On 5 June 2010, Rogers departed the club by mutual consent. He made 15 league and cup appearances for Cork.
is first goal for t
In June 2010, Rogers signed for Limerick and had a short spell with Monaghan United before joining Drogheda United in July 2011 and was immediately named captain. His first goal for the Drogs came from the penalty spot in a 2–2 draw with Dundalk at Hunky Dorys Park.

In January 2012, Rogers decided to hang up his playing boots after a 20-year career and focus on the transition on becoming a coach by concentrating on his coaching qualifications

Managerial career
In 2013, Rogers was appointed as lead coach for Liverpool F.C.'s International Academy overseeing the club curriculum and coach education around Europe. Rogers was then promoted to Academy Manager of Liverpool F.C.'s residential academy in India and over a two-year period oversaw the progress and development of over 20 academy products play for the India national team. In 2015 Rogers was also headhunted by the then India national team manager Stephen Constantine to become assistant coach for the SAFF Championship success. 2016 would then see Rogers appointment as head Coach of DSK Shivajians FC in of the Indian I-League on a three-year contract. The club became bankrupt after one season which saw Rogers then reappointed as Liverpool F.C. International Academy Manager in South Korea.

On 2 December 2022, Rogers was announced as manager of Finn Harps on a 4 year contract.

Honours
Shelbourne
 League of Ireland: 2003, 2004, 2006

Dundee F.C.
 Scottish 1st Division Title: 1997

References

1975 births
Living people
English footballers
Association football defenders
English Football League players
National League (English football) players
Scottish Football League players
Scottish Premier League players
NIFL Premiership players
League of Ireland players
Tranmere Rovers F.C. players
Chester City F.C. players
Southport F.C. players
Dundee F.C. players
Ayr United F.C. players
Partick Thistle F.C. players
Scunthorpe United F.C. players
Peterborough United F.C. players
Carlisle United F.C. players
SC Cambuur players
Shelbourne F.C. players
Derry City F.C. players
St Patrick's Athletic F.C. players
Sporting Fingal F.C. players
Dundalk F.C. players
Lisburn Distillery F.C. players
Cork City F.C. players
Limerick F.C. players
Monaghan United F.C. players
Drogheda United F.C. players
Bohemian F.C. players
Home Farm F.C. coaches
Portadown F.C. players
English football managers
Nottingham Forest F.C. non-playing staff
English expatriate footballers
English expatriate sportspeople in Ireland
Expatriate association footballers in the Republic of Ireland